Singhana may refer to:

 Simhana or Singhana, a 13th-century ruler from present-day India
 Singhana, Madhya Pradesh, a village in India
 Singhana, Rajasthan, a town in India